Melese innocua is a moth of the family Erebidae. It was described by Paul Dognin in 1911. It is found in Colombia.

References

 Natural History Museum Lepidoptera generic names catalog

Melese
Moths described in 1911